Chiquimula is a city in Guatemala. It is the capital of the department of Chiquimula and the municipal seat for the surrounding municipality of the same name.
It is located some 174 km from Guatemala City and within Guatemala known as "La perla del oriente" (the pearl of the east).

History

In 1851 during the Battle of La Arada Guatemalan military won over El Salvador and Honduras military forces, which is why Chiquimula was named "Ciudad Procer" Hero City.

Population
Chiquimula is the most populous city of eastern Guatemala. The official population of the city was 37,602, according to the 2002 census.  the population had increased to 111,505.

In the news
In January 2021, a caravan of between 7,000- 9,000 migrants from Honduras, who had departed from San Pedro Sula was heading towards the United States and  broke through police lines at Vado Hondo, a village near Chiquimula.

Sports
Sacachispas football club play in the Liga Nacional de Guatemala, they top-highest football division in Guatemala. Their home stadium is the Estadio Las Victorias.

The club has also played in the Liga Mayor, having reached their best position in the 1995-96 season, when they were runners-up. They have been playing in the second division since 2000.

Notable people
Ismael Cerna (1856–1901), poet
Yony Flores (born 1983), footballer

References

Municipalities of the Chiquimula Department
Populated places established in 1530
1530 establishments in the Spanish Empire